Alisalia is a genus of rove beetles in the family Staphylinidae. There are about 10 described species in Alisalia.

Species
These 10 species belong to the genus Alisalia:
 Alisalia antennalis Casey, 1911
 Alisalia austiniana Casey, 1911
 Alisalia bistriata (Bernhauer, 1909)
 Alisalia brevipennis Casey, 1911
 Alisalia delicata Casey, 1911
 Alisalia elongata Klimaszewski & Webster, 2009
 Alisalia minuta Klimaszewski & Webster, 2009
 Alisalia minutissima Casey, 1911
 Alisalia parallela Casey, 1911
 Alisalia testacea Casey, 1911

References

Further reading

External links

 

Aleocharinae
Articles created by Qbugbot